Khalid Durán (4 April 1939 – 17 April 2010) was a specialist in the history, sociology and politics of the Islamic world. He studied Middle Eastern languages and Islam in Bosnia and Morocco, and sociology and political science at the universities of Bonn and Berlin.

In the 1970s, he worked at Pakistan's Islamic Research Institute and traveled extensively in the Middle East and South Asia. He was a visiting professor at universities in Pakistan, Austria, Germany, Scandinavia, and the United States, teaching at departments of anthropology, history, religion, and sociology. He is the author of five books and numerous articles on Islam, the Middle East, North Africa, and Central and South Asia, covering both history and current affairs.

Career

Durán was trained in Middle Eastern languages and Islamic studies in Morocco, Bosnia, and Pakistan.

From 1961 to 1968, he studied political science and sociology at the Universities of Bonn and Berlin.

Durán was a Senior Fellow and Researcher with the German Institute for Middle East Studies (Deutsches Orient-Institut) in Hamburg from 1978 to 1986. In 1984–1985 he also worked with the Tokyo-based UNU (United Nations University).

After 1986, Durán was a visiting professor of Middle East Studies at a number of universities in the United States, including Temple University (Philadelphia, PA); American University (Washington, DC); University of California, Irvine; University of Louisville, KY.

Durán was the editor of TransIslam Magazine, a quarterly journal analyzing Islam-related political and sociological developments. He was the president of the Ibn Khaldun Society.

The political epithet Islamofascism

According to The Guardian'''s Albert Scardino, Duran coined the term "Islamofascism." Malise Ruthven, however, used the word in an article published in The Independent'' of 8 September 1990 (p. 15).

References

External links
 Khalid Durán at SourceWatch
 Khalid Durán: An American Rushdie? article by Daniel Pipes.
 Khalid Durán Information based on Social Security Death Master File.

American University faculty and staff
Middle East Forum
University of Bonn alumni
Temple University faculty
Critics of Islamism
University of Louisville faculty
University of California, Irvine faculty
1939 births
2010 deaths